HMS E25 was a British E class submarine built by William Beardmore and Company, Dalmuir. She was, along with the future , one of a pair of submarines ordered by the Ottoman Navy on 29 April 1914, but was taken over by the Royal Navy and assigned the E25 name. She was laid down in November 1914, launched on 23 August 1915, and was commissioned on 4 October 1915. HMS E25 was sold on 14 December 1921.

Design
She was powered by two  Vickers eight-cylinder two-stroke diesel engines and two  electric motors.

E25 was armed with a 12-pounder QF gun, mounted forward of the conning tower. She had five 18 inch (450 mm) torpedo tubes, two in the bow, one either side amidships, and one in the stern; a total of 10 torpedoes were carried.

E-Class submarines had wireless systems with  power ratings; in some submarines, these were later upgraded to  systems by removing a midship torpedo tube. Their maximum design depth was  although in service some reached depths of below . Some submarines contained Fessenden oscillator systems.

Crew
Her complement was three officers and 28 men.

References

Bibliography
 
 

 

British E-class submarines of the Royal Navy
Ships built on the River Clyde
1915 ships
World War I submarines of the United Kingdom
Royal Navy ship names